This is a list of destinations and airports that Air Midwest served. In January 2008, the airline had scheduled service to 38 cities in 12 states.

United States

Arizona
Kingman (Kingman Airport)
Phoenix (Sky Harbor International Airport)
Prescott (Ernest A. Love Field)

Arkansas
El Dorado (South Arkansas Regional Airport at Goodwin Field)
Harrison (Boone County Airport)
Hot Springs (Memorial Field Airport)
Jonesboro (Jonesboro Municipal Airport)
Little Rock (Little Rock National Airport)

California
Merced (Merced Municipal Airport) 
Visalia (Visalia Municipal Airport)

Colorado
Colorado Springs (Colorado Springs Municipal Airport)

Georgia
Athens (Athens-Ben Epps Airport)

Kansas
Dodge City (Dodge City Regional Airport)
Garden City (Garden City Regional Airport)
Great Bend (Great Bend Municipal Airport)
Hays (Hays Regional Airport)
Manhattan (Manhattan Regional Airport)
Salina (Salina Municipal Airport)

Missouri
Columbia (Columbia Regional Airport)
Joplin (Joplin Regional Airport)
Kansas City (Kansas City International Airport) Hub
Kirksville (Kirksville Regional Airport)

Nebraska
Grand Island (Central Nebraska Regional Airport) 
McCook (McCook Regional Airport) 
Omaha (Eppley Airfield)

Nevada
Ely (Ely Airport) 
Las Vegas (McCarran International Airport)

New Mexico
Alamogordo (Alamogordo-Municipal)
Alamogordo (Alamogordo-White Sands Regional Airport) 
Albuquerque (Albuquerque International Sunport)
Carlsbad (Cavern City Air Terminal)
Carlsbad (Carlsbad Airport)
Clovis (Clovis Airport)
Farmington (Four Corners Regional Airport)
Gallup (Gallup Municipal Airport)
Hobbs (Lea County Regional Airport)
Roswell (Roswell International Air Center)
Silver City (Grant County Airport)

North Carolina
Charlotte (Charlotte/Douglas International Airport)

Pennsylvania
DuBois (DuBois Regional Airport)
Franklin (Venango Regional Airport)
Pittsburgh (Pittsburgh International Airport)

Texas
Dallas/Fort Worth (Dallas/Fort Worth International Airport)

West Virginia
Lewisberg (Greenbrier Valley Airport)

Air Midwest